Mauno Roiha (6 September 1911 – 7 March 1981) was a Finnish equestrian. He competed at the 1948 Summer Olympics, the 1952 Summer Olympics and the 1956 Summer Olympics.

References

1911 births
1981 deaths
Finnish male equestrians
Finnish dressage riders
Olympic equestrians of Finland
Equestrians at the 1948 Summer Olympics
Equestrians at the 1952 Summer Olympics
Equestrians at the 1956 Summer Olympics
Sportspeople from Vyborg